The canton of Dieppe-1 is an administrative division of the Seine-Maritime department, in northern France. It was created at the French canton reorganisation which came into effect in March 2015. Its seat is in Dieppe.

It consists of the following communes:

Ambrumesnil
Aubermesnil-Beaumais
Colmesnil-Manneville
Dieppe (partly)
Hautot-sur-Mer
Longueil
Martigny
Offranville
Ouville-la-Rivière
Quiberville
Rouxmesnil-Bouteilles
Saint-Aubin-sur-Scie
Saint-Denis-d'Aclon
Sainte-Marguerite-sur-Mer
Sauqueville
Tourville-sur-Arques
Varengeville-sur-Mer

References

Cantons of Seine-Maritime
Dieppe